The 2019 Judo Grand Slam Düsseldorf was held in Düsseldorf, Germany from 22 to 24 February 2019.

Medal summary

Men's events

Women's events

Source Results

Medal table

References

External links
 

2019 IJF World Tour
2019 Judo Grand Slam
Judo